The 1980 Pro Bowl was the NFL's 30th annual all-star game which featured the outstanding performers from the 1979 season. The game was played on Sunday, January 27, 1980, at Aloha Stadium in Honolulu, Hawaii before 48,060 fans. The final score was NFC 37, AFC 27.

Don Coryell of the San Diego Chargers lead the AFC team against an NFC team coached by Dallas Cowboys head coach Tom Landry. The referee was Dick Jorgensen.

Chuck Muncie of the New Orleans Saints was named the game's Most Valuable Player. Players on the winning NFC team received $5,000 apiece while the AFC participants each took home $2,500.

Starting in his seventh and final Pro Bowl, defensive end Jack Youngblood of the Los Angeles Rams played in the game with a fractured left fibula, just as he had played during the NFC Divisional Playoff and in Super Bowl XIV. Pro Bowl Flashback Friday: Jack Youngblood's broken leg

This was the first of thirty consecutive Pro Bowls played in Honolulu. It also marked a return to the game being played on a Sunday.

References

External links

Pro Bowl
Pro Bowl
Pro Bowl
Pro Bowl
Pro Bowl
American football competitions in Honolulu
January 1980 sports events in the United States